Ahmadi Square is a square in Shiraz, Iran. The most important places near this square are Shah Cheragh, Shiraz main Friday's prayer's place, Beyn-ol Harameyn Shopping Center and Ahmadi Bazar.

Transportation

Streets
 Dastgheyb Boulevard
 Hazrati Street

Buses
 Route 1
 Route 2
 Route 3
 Route 4
 Route 5
 Route 14
 Route 25
 Route 26
 Route 31
 Route 33
 Route 35
 Route 45
 Route 75
 Route 96
 Route 97
 Route 155

Streets in Shiraz